Michele Pawk (born November 16, 1961) is an American actress and singer. She is also an associate professor for theatre.

Biography
Born in Butler, Pennsylvania, Pawk attended Allegheny College and the College Conservatory of Music in Cincinnati, where she received her BFA in musical theater. After graduation, she spent a year working in a musical revue at Disney World. In 1988, she made her Broadway debut in a short-lived musical entitled Mail, but it wasn't until 1992 that she made her mark with her performance in the Ira and George Gershwin-inspired production Crazy for You, for which she was nominated for a Drama Desk Award as Outstanding Featured Actress in a Musical. From there she went on to three successful revivals – Merrily We Roll Along (1994), Chicago (1996), and Cabaret (1998) – and an original musical, Seussical (2000), based on the works of Dr. Seuss.

In 2002, Pawk earned critical raves for her performance in Hollywood Arms, the Carrie Hamilton–Carol Burnett play adapted from Burnett's memoir, One More Time. Her portrayal of an alcoholic who dreams of success as a movie magazine writer, a character based on Burnett's mother, won her the Tony Award as Best Featured Actress in a Play. She was featured in Hairspray as Velma Von Tussle, after appearing in Mamma Mia! as "Donna" (October 19, 2005 – February 20, 2006).

Pawk's television credits include L.A. Law, The Golden Girls, and all three editions of the Law & Order franchise. She appeared in small roles in the films Jeffrey (1995) and Cradle Will Rock (1999). She also guest starred on an episode of Quantum Leap (1990) and Law & Order: Special Victims Unit (2020).

Pawk was featured alongside Victoria Clark and Jonathan Groff in the New York premiere of "Prayer for My Enemy" by Craig Lucas at the Playwrights Horizons Theater. The play touches on several topics including the Iraq War (Groff plays a young veteran), homosexuality, alcoholism, and the definition of family. The play ran from November 14, 2008, through December 21, 2008. In December 2022, Pawk took over the role of Madame Morrible in the Broadway production of Wicked.

Teaching
Pawk has been a full-time faculty member at Wagner College, Staten Island, New York, since 2010, teaching advanced acting, directing and film studies.

Personal life
She is married to actor John Dossett. They have a son, Jack, born in February 2000.

Two of Michele's uncles, Johnny Pawk and Steve Pawk, were early professional basketball players in the 1930s.

Awards and nominations
Awards
 2003 Tony Award for Best Featured Actress in a Play – Hollywood Arms
 2020 Lucille Lortel Award for Best Featured Actress in a Play – Heroes of the Fourth Turning

Nominations
 1992 Drama Desk Award for Outstanding Featured Actress in a Musical – Crazy for You
 1998 Drama Desk Award for Outstanding Featured Actress in a Musical – Cabaret
 1998 Outer Critics Circle Award for Outstanding Featured Actress in a Musical – Cabaret
 2006 Drama Desk Award for Outstanding Featured Actress in a Play – The Paris Letter
 2011 Drama Desk Award for Outstanding Actress in a Play – A Small Fire

References

External links
 Michele Pawk official website
 
 
 

1961 births
Living people
Allegheny College alumni
American women singers
American film actresses
American stage actresses
American television actresses
Musicians from Pittsburgh
People from Butler, Pennsylvania
People from South Orange, New Jersey
Singers from Pennsylvania
University of Cincinnati – College-Conservatory of Music alumni
21st-century American women